Krestovaya is a rural locality (a village) in Semizerye Rural Settlement, Kaduysky District, Vologda Oblast, Russia. The population was 19 as of 2002.

Geography 
Krestovaya is located 61 km northwest of Kaduy (the district's administrative centre) by road. Kananyevskaya is the nearest rural locality.

References 

Rural localities in Kaduysky District